Chatkran may refer to:
 Geghashen, Armenia
 Nor Geghi, Armenia